Juan Pablo Forero Carreño (born August 3, 1983) is a professional track and road cyclist from Colombia.  He has represented Colombia at the 2007 Pan American Games in Rio de Janeiro, Brazil  where he won a silver medal in team pursuit with team mates Carlos Alzate, Arles Castro and Jairo Pérez.  He also competed at the 2008 Summer Olympics in Beijing, PR China.  He was born in Cota, Cundinamarca.

Career

2003
1st Stage 3 Clásica Nacional Ciudad de Anapoima
1st Aguascalientes World Cup  – Team Pursuit

2nd National Track Championships – Madison
 Pan American Games – Team Pursuit

2004
1st Prologue & Stage 3 Vuelta a Colombia Sub-23
2005
1st  National Under-23 Road Championships
1st Stage 5 Vuelta al Valle del Cauca
1st Prologue Vuelta ciclista a la Republica del Ecuador
2nd National Track Championships – Scratch
2006
1st Stages 6, 11 & 15 Vuelta a Colombia
2007
 Pan American Track Championships – Team Pursuit

1st Stage 1 Vuelta al Valle del Cauca
 Pan American Games – Team Pursuit

3rd Overall Tour de Nez
2008
1st Stage 2 Vuelta al Tolima
1st Stage 15 International Cycling Classic
1st Stage 4 Vuelta a Cundinamarca
1st Stage 4 Clásico RCN
2009
1st Stages 1 & 4 Clasica International de Tulcan
2nd Circuito de Getxo
2012
1st Stage 5 Vuelta a Colombia

References
 

1983 births
Living people
Colombian male cyclists
Colombian track cyclists
Cyclists at the 2003 Pan American Games
Cyclists at the 2007 Pan American Games
Olympic cyclists of Colombia
Cyclists at the 2008 Summer Olympics
Vuelta a Colombia stage winners
People from Cundinamarca Department
Pan American Games medalists in cycling
Pan American Games silver medalists for Colombia
Pan American Games bronze medalists for Colombia
Medalists at the 2003 Pan American Games
Medalists at the 2007 Pan American Games
20th-century Colombian people
21st-century Colombian people
Competitors at the 2002 Central American and Caribbean Games